Phelipe Pelim (born 5 January 1990) is a Brazilian judoka.

He is the silver medallist of the 2017 Judo Grand Prix Cancún in the -60 kg category.

References

External links
 

1991 births
Living people
Brazilian male judoka
21st-century Brazilian people
20th-century Brazilian people